Giuseppe Patrucco (born February 4, 1932 in Turin) is a retired Italian professional football player.

Honours
 Serie A champion: 1957/58.

1932 births
Living people
Italian footballers
Serie A players
Genoa C.F.C. players
Parma Calcio 1913 players
Juventus F.C. players
A.C. Monza players
S.S.D. Sanremese Calcio players
Association football defenders
Footballers from Turin